In public choice theory, tax choice (sometimes called taxpayer sovereignty, earmarking, or fiscal subsidiarity) is the belief that individual taxpayers should have direct control over how their taxes are spent. Its proponents apply the theory of consumer choice to public finance.  They claim taxpayers react positively when they are allowed to allocate portions of their taxes to specific spending.

Tax relationship between the state and taxpayers 
The term tax sovereignty emphasizes the perceived equal status of state and taxpayer, instead of the traditional view of the dominant position of the state in taxation. Tracing back to the legitimacy of the state, Viktoria Raritska points out that “the legitimacy of the state as a formal institution is substantiated by the people’s refusal of their freedoms and an agreement to submit to government in exchange for the protection of their guaranteed rights”. Proponents of tax sovereignty believe that in a traditional system of taxation, the taxpayer gives up their natural liberty in exchange for the protection from the state and the provision of public services; which impels the state to take public interests as its obligation to maintain social order and citizen safety.

This mutual relationship makes taxation a link between the state and taxpayers. Proponents of tax sovereignty believe that in such a relationship, the taxpayer endows power to the state to ensure the satisfaction of the public interest. Furthermore, they propose that the taxpayer has granted the state tax sovereignty. “It is due to the fact that the taxpayer endows the state with tax sovereignty. Thus, state has not only the rights on taxation, but also the obligations, which correspond to the taxpayer's rights”. Therefore, the existence of the state's perceived tax sovereignty is attributed to the taxpayer.

The Swedish economist Knut Wicksell’s theory also argues that "taxation should be based on the principle of value and counter-value, as if taxation was a voluntary transaction between the individual and the state".

Opinions 
Daniel J. Brown examines tax-target plans in educational programs.

Alan T. Peacock, in his 1961 book The Welfare Society, advocates greater diversity in public services (education, housing, hospitals).

Optimal quantities of public goods 
According to Vincent and Elinor Ostrom, it is possible that government may oversupply, and a market arrangement may undersupply, those public goods for which exclusion is not feasible.

Foot voting versus tax choice 
Foot voting and voting with one's taxes are two methods that have been proposed to allow taxpayers to reveal their preferences for public policies.  Foot voting refers to where people move to areas that offer a more attractive bundle of public policies. In theory foot voting would force local governments to compete for taxpayers. Tax choice, on the other hand, would allow taxpayers to indicate their preferences with their individual taxes. Wallace E. Oates wrote: "In the Tiebout model, for example, there is costless mobility; individuals seek out a jurisdiction that provides exactly the level of output of the public good that they wish to consume. In so doing, they reveal their preferences for 'local' public outputs and generate a Pareto-efficient outcome in the public sector."

Legislative measures 
Four bills involving tax choice have been introduced by the United States Congress since 1971. The Presidential Election Campaign Fund, enacted in 1971, allows taxpayers to allocate $3 of their taxes to presidential election campaigns. The 2000 Taxpayers’ Choice Debt Reduction Act would have allowed taxpayers to designate money toward reduction of the national debt. The 2007 Opt Out of Iraq War Act would have allowed taxpayers to designate money toward certain social programs. The 2011 Put Your Money Where Your Mouth Is Act would have allowed taxpayers to make voluntary contributions (not tax payments) to the government.<ref>Kasperowicz, Pete, "Rep. Campbell proposes tax form change to encourage donations to the government".  The Hill", 18 April 2011.</ref> These later bills died in committee.

 In popular culture 
When asked what her first executive order as president of the United States would be, Ellen DeGeneres advocated a mix of voluntary taxation and tax choice, stating "you should get to choose where your money goes instead of giving it and just letting them decide, I think you should decide."

In 2009, during the global financial crisis, Pope Benedict XVI advocated for a form of tax choice in his third encyclical. He wrote: "One possible approach to development aid would be to apply effectively what is known as fiscal subsidiarity, allowing citizens to decide how to allocate a portion of the taxes they pay to the State. Provided it does not degenerate into the promotion of special interests, this can help to stimulate forms of welfare solidarity from below, with obvious benefits in the area of solidarity for development as well."

 Examples 

 Iceland 
Taxpayers in Iceland who belong to an officially registered religious group or secular humanist organization  must pay a congregation tax (Icelandic: sóknargjald, plural sóknargjöld) which is deducted from income taxes and goes to the individual's respective organization. In the past, the sóknargjald of those who do not belong to any recognized religious organization went to the University of Iceland, but this was changed in 2009. In cases of individuals not belonging to a registered religious group or secular humanist organization, the amount that would otherwise be used for the sóknargjald remains now part of the income tax budget. In 2015, the monthly sóknargjald'' amounted to 824 Icelandic krónur, about $US6.

Italy 
Italian taxpayers devolve a compulsory 8 ‰ = 0.8% (eight per mil, i.e. eight per thousand) from their annual income tax return to an organised religion recognised by Italy or, alternatively, to a state-run social assistance scheme.

Spain 
The Spanish tax declaration form has one checkbox for the Catholic Church, none for other religious groups and a second checkbox for activities of social interest. These checkboxes don't influence the total tax amount, but, for each ticked checkbox, 0.7% of the total amount are used as indicated.

See also

References

Further reading 
 Baker, Russell – Taxpayers' Choice The New York Times. 1990
 Binowski, Brittany – Why Mandatory Taxes Are Bad – And How The Government Should Fix Them (But Probably Won't). Forbes. 18 June 2012
 Blinder, Alan S. – The Economics of Public Finance: Essays 1989
 Buchanan, James M. – Public Finance in Democratic Process: Fiscal Institutions and Individual Choice 1967
 	
 Le Grand, Julian - The Other Invisible Hand: Delivering Public Services through Choice and Competition 2007

Public choice theory
Political science theories
Theory of taxation
Decentralization